Pavol Majerník (born 31 December 1978) is a Slovak football manager and former player, who currently is the head coach of MFK Skalica.

References

External links
 
 fcvion.sk 

1978 births
Living people
Slovak footballers
Association football defenders
FC Senec players
FC VSS Košice players
Olympiacos Volos F.C. players
FC ViOn Zlaté Moravce players
MFK Skalica players
Slovak Super Liga players
Expatriate footballers in Greece
Slovakia international footballers
People from Vrbové
Sportspeople from the Trnava Region
MFK Skalica managers
Slovak football managers